A close-in weapon system (CIWS  ) is a point-defense weapon system for detecting and destroying short-range incoming missiles and enemy aircraft which have penetrated the outer defenses, typically mounted on a naval ship. Nearly all classes of larger modern warships are equipped with some kind of CIWS device.

There are two types of CIWS systems. A gun-based CIWS usually consists of a combination of radars, computers, and rapid-firing multiple-barrel rotary cannons placed on a rotating turret.  Missile-based CIWSs use either infra-red, passive radar/ESM, or semi-active radar terminal guidance to guide missiles to the targeted enemy aircraft or other threats.  In some cases, CIWS are used on land to protect military bases.  In this case, the CIWS can also protect the base from shell and rocket fire.

Gun systems

A gun-based CIWS usually consists of a combination of radars, computers and rotary or revolver cannon placed on a rotating, automatically aimed gun mount. Examples of gun-based CIWS products in operation are:
 AK-630, 630M, 306, 630M1-2, and 630M2  - 30×165mm caliber
 Aselsan GOKDENIZ and ER - 35×228mm
 DARDO and Fast Forty - 40×365mmR
 Denel 35mm Dual Purpose Gun - 35×228mm
 Goalkeeper CIWS - 30×173mm
 Kashtan CIWS and M - 30×165mm
 Meroka CIWS - 20×128mm
 Myriad CIWS - 25×184mm
 Rheinmetall Oerlikon Millennium Gun - 35×228mm
 Phalanx CIWS Block 0, 1, 1A, and 1B - 20×102mm
 Sea Zenith - 25×184mm
 H/PJ-76A CIWS - 37×240mm
 Type 730 and Type 1130 CIWS - 30×165mm
 Pantsir-M - 30×165mm

Limitations of gun systems
Thus some CIWS like Russian Kashtan and Pantsir systems are augmented by installing the close range SAMs on the same mount for increased tactical flexibility.
 Limited kill probability: even if the missile is hit and damaged, this may not be enough to destroy it entirely or to alter its course. Even  in the case of a direct hit, the missile, or fragments from it may still impact the intended target, particularly if the final interception distance is short. This is especially true if the gun fires kinetic-energy-only projectiles.

Comparison table

Missile systems
 9M337 Sosna-R
 HQ-10 / FL-3000N
 Pantsir / Pantsir-M missile system
 RIM-116 Rolling Airframe Missile
 Sea Oryx
 Tor missile system

Land-based
CIWS are also used on land in the form of C-RAM. On a smaller scale, active protection systems are used in some tanks (to destroy rocket propelled grenades (RPGs), and several are in development. The Drozd system was deployed on Soviet Naval Infantry tanks in the early 1980s, but later replaced by explosive reactive armour. Other systems that are available or under development are the Russian Arena, Israeli Trophy, American Quick Kill and South African-Swedish LEDS-150.

Laser systems
Laser-based CIWS systems are being researched. In August 2014 an operational prototype was deployed to the Persian Gulf aboard . The Scientific and Technological Research Council of Turkey (Turkish: Türkiye Bilimsel ve Teknolojik Araştırma Kurumu, TÜBİTAK) is the second organisation after the US to have developed and tested a High Power Laser CIWS prototype System which is intended to be used on the TF-2000 class frigate and on Turkish airborne systems.

References

Anti-aircraft guns
Naval anti-aircraft guns
Naval surface-to-air missiles
Weapons countermeasures